Andrei Vladimirovich Tropillo (21 March 1951, Leningrad) is a Soviet and Russian record producer, music publisher, sound engineer, founder of the label AnTrop (""), and rock musician.

Biography 
Tropillo first became involved in the Soviet rock scene in the 1970s. In 1976, he initially attempted to set up a small record factory in a room rented from his then-employer, the Geophysics department of Leningrad University. He also organized concerts for several bands, including Mashina Vremeni, and used the income to buy technical equipment for sound recording. Tropillo later started working part-time at the House of Pioneers in the Krasnogvardeysky District of Leningrad, teaching members of the Young Pioneers about sound recording and giving guitar lessons. This position afforded him better access to sound equipment and allowed him to develop a studio.

Tropillo began to invite local rock bands to record in the House of Pioneers, starting with Aquarium and Mify. From 1979 to 1985, the albums of such groups as Mashina Vremeni, Aquarium, Zoopark, Kino, and Alisa were recorded in his unofficial studio, AnTrop. From 1980 to 1986, Tropillo and Aquarium worked together to record ten albums. Albums were initially distributed as magnitizdat. Tropillo would distribute master copies to recording cooperatives on reel-to-reel tapes, which were then re-copied and distributed to other cooperatives across the country. 

In 1985, Tropillo was dismissed from his role at the House of Pioneers and his studio was closed. He temporarily stored his equipment at the Leningrad Rock Club, before setting up a new AnTrop studio. The 1986 compilation album Red Wave, released in the USA, was composed of tracks recorded in Tropillo's studio, although Tropillo was not credited by name.  

In 1987, Tropillo started working at Melodiya. He brought over several of the master tapes recorded in his old studio and made them available to the label, sometimes without the permission of the musicians involved. In his position at Melodiya, Tropillo was able to officially release some of his previously made recordings as LPs. In 1989, he became the director of the Leningrad branch of Melodiya. 

In 1991, the St. Petersburg Evangelical-Lutheran Church became the new home of the AnTrop label. From here, Tropillo released copies of albums by Western rock bands such as The Beatles, Rolling Stones, Led Zeppelin, Black Sabbath, and Sonic Youth, taking advantage of gaps in the Russian intellectual property laws at the time. He would make alterations to the record covers to circumvent copyright laws. On the sleeve of the AnTrop release of Sgt. Pepper's Lonely Hearts Club Band, Karl Marx is replaced by the Russian Beatles fan Kolya Vasin and Tropillo's face is inserted in the top row. In his interview for the BBC Storyville documentary How the Beatles Rocked the Kremlin, Tropillo stated: "I support not copyright but copyleft. Because I'm sure that in Russia we should support musical piracy, because musical piracy was the key to have freedom in Russia, to have free information."

Discography 

In addition to rock groups, Tropillo produced recordings of the following jazz musicians:

 Sergey Kuryokhin
 Vladimir Chekasin
 Valentina Ponomaryova
 the duo Vladislav Makarov and Aleksandr Kondrashkin (1984)

References

External links 
 

Audio engineers
Music publishers (people)
Russian record producers
Russian publishers (people)
Russian audio engineers
Living people
1951 births